The Sixth Federal Electoral District of Chiapas (VI Distrito Electoral Federal de Chiapas) is one of the 300 Electoral Districts into which Mexico is divided for the purpose of elections to the federal Chamber of Deputies and one of 12 such districts in the state of Chiapas.

It elects one deputy to the lower house of Congress for each three-year legislative period, by means of the first past the post system.

District territory
The Sixth  District of Chiapas is located in the centre of the state and covers the municipalities of
Acala, Chiapa de Corzo, Chiapilla, Chicoasén, Ixtapa, Las Rosas, Nicolás Ruiz, Osumacinta, San Lucas, Soyaló, Suchiapa, Totolapa, and Venustiano Carranza, plus the southern and western parts of the municipality of Tuxtla Gutiérrez.

The district's head town (cabecera distrital), where results from individual polling stations are gathered together and collated, is the city of Tuxtla Gutiérrez.

Previous districting schemes

1996–2005 district
Between 1996 and 2005, the Sixth  District had a different configuration. The head town was Chiapa de Corzo and it covered the following municipalities:
Acala, Chiapa de Corzo, Chiapilla,  Ixtapa, Nicolás Ruiz, San Lucas, Soyaló, Totolapa and Venustiano Carranza, all of which are still part of the district, plus:
Bochil, La Concordia, and Villa Corzo.

Deputies returned to Congress from this district

L Legislature
1976–1979: Leonardo León Cerpa (PRI)
LI Legislature
1979–1982: Alberto Ramón Cerdio Bado (PRI)
LII Legislature
1982–1985:
LIII Legislature
1985–1988:
LIV Legislature
1988–1991: Romeo Ruiz Armento (PRI)
LV Legislature
1991–1994:
LVI Legislature
1994–1997: Rafael Ceballos Cancino (PRI)
LVII Legislature
2000–1999: Roberto Albores Guillén (PRI)
1999–2000: Agustín Santiago Albores (PRI)
LVIII Legislature
2000–2003: Roberto Domínguez Castellanos (PRI)
LIX Legislature
2003–2006: Roberto Aguilar Hernández (PRI)
LX Legislature
2006–2009: Héctor Narcía Álvarez (PRD)

References and notes 

Federal electoral districts of Mexico
Government of Chiapas